Joelle Marie Carter (born October 10, 1972) is an American actress. She is known for playing Ava Crowder in the FX series Justified.

Early life 
Carter was born in Thomasville, Georgia. Her father, Jimmy, was in the U.S. Army and the family moved often throughout the United States. She attended high school in Albany, Georgia, and enrolled at Augusta State University on a full athletic scholarship for swimming and cross-country. She studied acting at the William Esper Studio.

Career 
She has been featured in many movies, most notably the opening scene in American Pie 2. She also has an extensive resume of television bit parts, appearing on shows and in films including High Fidelity, Inconceivable, and Cold Storage. From 2010 to 2015, she played Ava Crowder in the television series Justified on FX. Reviewing the pilot episode for The A.V. Club, writer Scott Tobias characterized her as "absurdly sexy". She also appeared in Kevin Greutert's 2014 horror-thriller film Jessabelle.

Personal life 
She lives and works in New York City with her husband Andy Bates, a filmmaker. The couple has formed a film production company named Blarma.

Filmography

Film

Television

References

External links 
 

1972 births
American female dancers
21st-century American dancers
American film actresses
American television actresses
American women comedians
Comedians from New York
Living people
People from Thomasville, Georgia
American stand-up comedians
20th-century American actresses
21st-century American actresses
21st-century American comedians
Comedians from Georgia (U.S. state)
Actresses from New York City
Actresses from Georgia (U.S. state)
Dancers from New York (state)
Dancers from Georgia (U.S. state)
Augusta State University alumni